Shield for Murder is a 1954 American film noir crime film co-directed by and starring Edmond O'Brien as a police detective who has become malevolent. It was based on the novel of the same name by William P. McGivern.

Plot
Lieutenant Barney Nolan, a 16-year veteran of the police force, has had it with the world. He may have been a good detective once, but has become corrupt and vicious. In a secluded alley late one night he fatally shoots a bookmaker in the back and steals his $25,000. Barney then claims he had been forced to kill the man because he tried to escape custody. Sergeant Mark Brewster, his friend and protégé, believes him, as does the Captain of Detectives, Captain Gunnarson. However, newspaper reporter Cabot suspects otherwise, as there have been rumors about Barney's illicit activities for a while.

Barney takes his girlfriend, Patty Winters, to see a new house that is for sale, in which he suggests the two of them could have a happy life.  He slips away to hide the money outside, behind the home. When he returns the two have a romantic moment; it is insinuated he asked Patty to marry him and, through a later conversation with Mark, it is clear that she said yes.

Packy Reed, the dead man's boss, sends private investigators Fat Michaels and Laddie O'Neil to tell Barney he wants to see him.  After Barney leaves for the meeting, the two men accost Patty. Packy gives Barney one chance to return the money, but Barney is uncooperative.

Deaf-mute Ernst Sternmuller witnessed the bookmaker's murder. He goes to the police station with a note explaining what he saw, but gives it to Barney, whom he does not recognize as the killer. Barney later goes to the man's apartment to try to buy his silence. Sternmuller recognizes Barney's clothing and realizes he is the killer.  He refuses to take money to keep quiet.  Barney furiously pushes the old man, who falls, strikes his head, and dies.  Barney stages things to make it seem like an accident. He is unaware that Sternmuller had been writing a full account of the murder.  Mark, investigating the death, finds this narrative.

Meanwhile, Barney drinks and fends off a flirtatious blonde Beth in the bar. He repeatedly attempts to reach Patty on the phone and, when he finally does, she reveals that Michaels and O'Neil had approached her menacingly.  Enraged, he telephones the two men to arrange a meeting, ostensibly to turn over the money he stole. When they arrive he pistol whips them both into unconsciousness, while everyone else in the bar reacts hysterically.

Barney goes home, where he discovers Mark is waiting to arrest him.  The two men struggle and Barney gets the upper hand. He knocks Mark out, after momentarily considering shooting him in the back of the head. He goes to Patty and persuades her to pack up to start her new life with him. He tells her Packy is trying to frame him, and for a while she believes him. But when he mistakenly mentions money he has, Patty realizes what Mark has suggested to her about Barney is true. They argue and he slaps her and leaves.

Mark, having regained consciousness, takes the notepad with Sturnmuller's account to his boss, Gunnarson, who initiates a manhunt. Barney overhears this on his police car radio. He retrieves his old patrolman's uniform and goes into hiding.  Through a shady acquaintance, he arranges to flee to Buenos Aires, but when he goes to pick up the ticket at a crowded swimming pool, he finds he has been set up - a bandaged Michaels is there.  Barney himself had been attempting a swindle, the "money he had handed over as payment for the getaway documents are newspaper clippings. He and Michaels shoot it out, while panicked swimmers dive for cover. Barney manages to kill the other man, then heads to the new house to retrieve the money he hid. By then Mark has figured out that Barney had hidden the $25,000 there. The police converge on the house as Barney arrives.  He shoots it out with them and manages to dig up the money, but as he emerges from the yard, he is confronted by several policemen. He fires at them, and they shoot him dead.

Cast
 Edmond O'Brien as Barney Nolan
 Marla English as Patty Winters
 John Agar as Mark Brewster
 Emile Meyer as Capt. Gunnarson
 Carolyn Jones as Beth, the Girl at Bar
 Claude Akins as Fat Michaels
 Lawrence Ryle as Laddie O'Neil (as Larry Ryle)
 Herbert Butterfield as Cabot (as Herbert Butterfield)
 Hugh Sanders as Packy Reed
 William Schallert as Assistant D.A.

Reception

Box office
According to producer Aubrey Schenck the film "grossed a lot of money, you wouldn't believe how much; on television it's made a fortune."

Critical response
Film critic Dennis Schwartz liked the film, writing, "It was a well-executed, action-packed film noir, co-directed and acted by Edmond O'Brien. It punctures a lot of the idyllic dreams about living in suburbia, as the cop's middle-class goals are made dirty. His downfall is seen as choosing violence over love and greed over a sense of duty. He's a bad cop and a bad person who has hidden behind his police shield, which he used to protect himself from the law. All the good he might have had in him is wasted."

Of note The Production Designer was Charles D. Hall, in one of his many later productions. Hall had been the art director of Dracula (1931), Frankenstein (1931), Murders in the Rue Morgue (1932), The Invisible Man (1933), The Black Cat (1934), Bride of Frankenstein (1935), and One Million B.C. (1940). In Shield, Hall includes many "found" objects and locations, all of which are deceptively simple. He used this technique in his second to last feature, The Unearthly (1957), the horror film he designed, credited as "Daniel Hall".

References

External links
 
 
 
 
 

1954 films
1954 directorial debut films
1954 crime films
American black-and-white films
American crime films
Film noir
Films based on American novels
Films directed by Edmond O'Brien
Films directed by Howard W. Koch
Films scored by Paul Dunlap
United Artists films
1950s English-language films
1950s American films